Jumonji domain containing 1C is a protein that in humans is encoded by the JMJD1C gene.

Function

The protein encoded by this gene interacts with thyroid hormone receptors and contains a jumonji domain. It is a candidate histone demethylase and is thought to be a coactivator for key transcription factors. It plays a role in the DNA-damage response pathway by demethylating the mediator of DNA damage checkpoint 1 (MDC1) protein, and is required for the survival of acute myeloid leukemia. Mutations in this gene are associated with Rett syndrome and intellectual disability.

Epigenetic regulation of spermatogenesis 
Jmjd1C belongs to the Jmjd1 family genes. Jmjd1C encodes a histone H3K9 demethylase. In addition, the JMJD1c gene has a role in mouse spermatogenesis.  In male homozygous Jmjd1C mouse knockouts are unable to produce sperm.  The mechanism may be the absence of interaction between JMJD1C with JMJD1c's partner proteins, for example, MDC1 and HSP90.

References

Further reading 

Human proteins